Yuswanto Aditya (born 10 May 2000) is an Indonesian professional footballer who plays as a centre back for Liga 1 club Barito Putera.

Club career

Barito Putera
Aditya is one of the young players promoted from the Barito Putera youth team. as well as being the Captain and he plays as a center-back. Aditya made his professional debut on 27 September 2021 in a match against PSM Makassar at the Wibawa Mukti Stadium, Cikarang.

He picked up his first career red card in a 2–1 defeat at RANS Nusantara on 29 August 2022. Despite this, Aditya returned to the first team and playing 23 minutes in second half for the side on 11 December, in a 0–0 draw over Dewa United. In a match against Persis Solo three days later, he played the full 90 minutes for the first time in a 0–0 draw in game-week 14. On 20 December, in a match against Bhayangkara saw Aditya playing in the centre–back position, where he continued to form a partnership with Renan Alves for the full 90 minutes.

He scored his first goal for the side on 9 March 2023 in a 2–1 win against Persebaya Surabaya. He remains the first choice after the club underwent a period of coach changes, recorded in the last six matches, he has always been a starting line-up choice under new coach Rahmad Darmawan.

International career
In November 2019, Aditya was named as Indonesia U-20 All Stars squad, to play in U-20 International Cup held in Bali.

Career statistics

Club

Notes

Honours

Individual
 Liga 1 U-20 Best Player: 2019

References

External links
 Yuswanto Aditya at Soccerway
 Yuswanto Aditya at Liga Indonesia

2000 births
Living people
People from Bandung
Sportspeople from West Java
Sportspeople from Bandung
Indonesian footballers
Liga 1 (Indonesia) players
PS Barito Putera players
Association football defenders
21st-century Indonesian people